Kalichanadukkam or Adukkam is a small town situated in the Kasaragod district of Kerala in India. Located between Nileshwar and Vellarikundu, it is 15 km from Nileshwaram, 19 km from Kanhangad, and 15 km from Vellarikkundu. 
From Kalichanadukkam junction one road is towards Kanhangad, second is towards Vellarikundu and the last road towards Nileshwar.

Educational institutions

 SNDP Arts and Science College
 Government High School
 Sanjo English medium high school
 Darul Uloom Madrasa

Banks

 Kerala Gramin Bank 
 District Co-op. Bank 
 Thayannur Service Sahakarana Bank
 SBI Kiosk Bank

Places of worship

 Dharmashastha Temple, Shasthampara
 St. Joseph's Church
 Vincentian Church
 Adukkam Farook Juma masjid 
 Badriya Masjid (Anappetty)

Transportation
There is a  bus stand in Kalichandukkam town. Buses go to Nileshwar, Kanhangad, Thayanur, Vellarikundu and Konnakkad. A national highway passing through Nileshwaram connects to Mangalore in the north and Kannur in the south. The nearest railway station is Nileshwar on Mangalore-Palakkad line. There are airports at Mangalore and kannur International Airport.

References

External links 
 https://web.archive.org/web/20160210221455/http://www.kalichanadukkam.com/
 http://kalichanadukkam.blogspot.in/p/about.html

Nileshwaram area